Pennyfuir Cemetery is a cemetery in Oban, Argyll and Bute, Scotland. It was established in the 19th century.

The cemetery contains 23 graves from the First World War and 58 from the Second World War. Four of the Second World War graves are of airmen who died in the same crash that killed Prince George, Duke of Kent, on 25 August 1942. In the centre of the war cemetery stands the Cross of Sacrifice, constructed from white Portland stone.

Notable burials
 David Hutcheson (1799–1880), shipbuilder
 Peter Macnab (1812–1892), architect and joiner
 Frances Shand Kydd (1936–2004), mother of Diana, Princess of Wales

References

19th-century establishments in Scotland
Cemeteries in Scotland
Buildings and structures in Argyll and Bute
Oban